The 1936 United States presidential election in Mississippi took place on November 3, 1936, as part of the 1936 United States presidential election. Mississippi voters chose nine representatives, or electors, to the Electoral College, who voted for president and vice president.

Mississippi was won by incumbent President Franklin D. Roosevelt (D–New York), running with Vice President John Nance Garner, with 97.03% of the popular vote, against Governor Alf Landon (R–Kansas), running with Frank Knox, with 2.75% of the popular vote.

By percentage of the popular vote won, Mississippi was Roosevelt's second-best state. The only state in which he won more of the popular vote than in Mississippi was in South Carolina, where he won 98.57%.

Results

References

Mississippi
1936
1936 Mississippi elections